Bonnie Ann Scott (born February 20, 1941) is a retired American actress and singer. She was best known for being the original female lead in the hit Broadway musical How to Succeed in Business Without Really Trying while at the age of only 20. Later she played Judy Bessemer during the first season of the ABC sitcom That Girl.

Early life
Scott was born Bonnie Ann Paul on February 20, 1941, in Philadelphia, Pennsylvania, the younger of two children born to Albert and Blanche Paul. Her elder brother was named Jordan. The family moved to Los Angeles in 1945.

Career

Scott began her professional career in singing and dancing at the age of two. She made her first television appearance at the age of eight performing live on the weekly ABC series Soapbox Theatre where she performed for two years.

She also appeared in a number of films, including Love Is Better Than Ever (MGM, 1952) Beware, My Lovely (RKO, 1952), Vicki (20th Century Fox, 1953) and Dondi (Allied Artists, 1961).

At the age of 13, Scott began performing on the musical stage. She starred in several off-Vine Street musicals, the first being Going Up in 1954. This was followed by a performance in Best Foot Forward, Paint Your Fingers and Vintage 60 in 1960. Scott also originated the role of Rosemary Pilkington in the 1961 Broadway musical How to Succeed in Business Without Really Trying , also appearing on the Grammy Award-winning original cast album. Her replacement, Michele Lee, also appeared in the film version of the musical.

At the age of 15, she signed on to RCA Records, not as Bonnie Paul but as Bonnie Scott so to avoid confusion with singer Bunny Paul, who was on contract with Capitol Records. While with RCA, Scott made several records and had a singing engagement at the Tropicana Las Vegas. She also made appearances on several television shows including The Jerry Lewis Show, Playhouse 90, The Adventures of Ozzie and Harriet and You Bet Your Life. She also had a supporting role as Judy Bessemer on the first season of ABC's That Girl in 1966. In 1977, She moved to St. Louis to be a Star of The Letter People. Her last appearance was in “Meet Miss E” (1978) before her retirement.

Personal life
In 1961, after the opening of the play How to Succeed in Business Without Really Trying, Scott met and married Robert Parker Hutchins, II. Hutchins was a backer for the musical. The two had twins, Wendy and Douglas, and she elected not to return to How to Succeed in Business Without Really Trying. She divorced Hutchins in 1966. Bonnie Scott wed a second time to Jon Armstrong, a public finance investment banker, in 1978. Scott has suffered with heart issues throughout her life and in 1994, Scott underwent successful cardiac surgery at UCSF Medical Center. She and her husband currently reside in Northern California.

Filmography

Film 

 Dondi (1961)
 It’s All Right (1971)
 It’s All Right 2 (1973)

Television 

 That Girl
 He & She
 Bert D'Angelo/Superstar
 The Streets of San Francisco
 The Letter People

References

1941 births
Living people
American women singers
American child actresses
American musical theatre actresses
American television actresses
Actresses from Philadelphia
Musicians from Philadelphia
21st-century American women